Philippine Offshore Gaming Operators (POGOs) is the official designation for firms operating in the Philippines which offer online gambling services to markets outside the Philippines.

Background
Philippine Offshore Gaming Operators or POGOs are online gambling firms that operate in the Philippines but cater to customers outside the country. To operate legally they must be licensed by the Philippine Amusement and Gaming Corporation (PAGCOR). They are obliged to restrict any individual in the Philippines regardless of citizenship, Filipino citizens regardless of location, and potential patrons in countries and territories where offshore gambling is illegal from availing their services; failure to do so risks license revocation.

PAGCOR started the processing of license applications for POGOs in 2016 after it decided not to renew the license of local online gambling firm PhilWeb in an effort to boost its revenue.

There are three license categories. Category 1 involves services that have live streaming with women online gambling dealers. Category 2 and 3 are sub-sectors of business process outsourcing (BPO) which provide back office support.

However, the IT and Business Process Association of the Philippines (IBPAP), an umbrella industry group of BPOs, do not consider POGOs in general as BPOs. IBPAP's members are registered with either the Philippine Economic Zone Authority or the Board of Investments while POGOs get their license to operate from PAGCOR, a fact the group argues differentiate POGOs from BPOs.

Prevalence
There are 56 PAGCOR-licensed POGOs as of June 9, 2019. It is estimated that at least 30 firms are operating in the Philippines illegally. KMC Savills Inc. projects that POGOs have utilized at least  of office space. While a significant portion of the Philippine offshore gambling industry cater to the Chinese, some serve the Korean and Vietnamese markets.

Employment
There are 138,000 foreigners employed by POGOs as of May 2019, with 83,760 of them holders of special work permits allowing them to stay in the country for at most six months. Only 17 percent of those employed in POGOs are Filipino nationals. Employment decreased significantly during the COVID-19 pandemic.

See also
Chinese gambling workers in the Philippines

References

Gambling in the Philippines
Online gambling